is a town located in Ōshima Subprefecture, Tokyo Metropolis, Japan. , the town had an estimated population of 7,762, and a population density of 85.5 persons per km².

Geography

Climate

History

It is uncertain when human settlement first began on Ōshima, but archaeological finds from the Jōmon period have been discovered, and the island is mention from early Nara period documents. It is mentioned in historical records for its many volcanic eruptions. After the start of the Meiji period, in 1878, the island came under the control of Tokyo-fu and was organized into six villages (Okada, Motomura, Senzu, Nomashi, Sashikiji and Habuminato) under Oshima subprefecture on April 1, 1908. The six villages were merged to form Ōshima Town on April 1, 1955.

In the mid-1930s, Izu Ōshima became a popular suicide destination after three schoolgirls jumped into the active volcano in the center of the island. In 1935 alone, more than 800 suicides were recorded.

The central volcano on the island, Mount Mihara erupted in 1965 and again in 1986, forcing the temporary evacuation of the inhabitants.

On 16 October 2013, Typhoon Wipha passed over the island, dropping  of rain in 24 hours and causing a landslide that killed 35 people.

Economy
Fishing and seasonal tourism are the mainstays of the economy of Ōshima.

Transportation

Airport
 
Ōshima Airport

Harbor
Port of Okada
Port of Motomachi

Education
Ōshima town operates three public elementary schools and three public junior high schools.

Junior high schools:
 Dai-ichi (No. 1 or First) (大島町立第一中学校)
 Daini (No. 2 or Second) (大島町立第二中学校)
 Daisan (No. 3 or Third) (大島町立第三中学校)

Elementary schools:
 Sakura Elementary School (大島町立さくら小学校)
 Tsubaki Elementary School (大島町立つばき小学校)
 Tsutsuji Elementary School (大島町立つつじ小学校)

Sister city relations
 - Hilo, Hawaii, United States

Local attractions
The island is known for its Camellia Festival, Hanabi Festival, five black sand beaches, and several onsen.

References

External links

Ōshima Town Official Website 

Towns in Tokyo
Populated coastal places in Japan